Hergiswil railway station is a Swiss railway station in the municipality of Hergiswil in the canton of Nidwalden. It is at the junction of the Brünig line, which links Lucerne and Interlaken, and the Luzern–Stans–Engelberg line. Both lines are of metre gauge and owned by the Zentralbahn railway company. To the south of the station the Brünig line enters the Lopper I tunnel to Alpnach whilst the Luzern–Stans–Engelberg line enters the Lopper II tunnel to Stansstad.

Services 
The following services stop at Hergiswil:

 Lucerne S-Bahn:
 : rush-hour service between Lucerne and Stans.

References

External links 
 

Railway stations in the canton of Nidwalden
Hergiswil
Zentralbahn stations